Jurkowice  is a village in the administrative district of Gmina Bogoria, within Staszów County, Świętokrzyskie Voivodeship, in south-central Poland.

The village has a population of  535.

Demography 
According to the 2002 Poland census, there were 527 people residing in Jurkowice village, of whom 49.9% were male and 50.1% were female. In the village, the population was spread out, with 26% under the age of 18, 40% from 18 to 44, 19.2% from 45 to 64, and 14.6% who were 65 years of age or older.
 Figure 1. Population pyramid of village in 2002 – by age group and sex

References

Villages in Staszów County